The 1998–99 season was the 67th in the history of Real Zaragoza and their 21st consecutive season in the second division. The club participated in the La Liga and the Copa del Rey.

Players

Transfers

Competitions

Overall record

La Liga

League table

Results summary

Results by round

Matches

Copa del Rey 

Zaragoza entered the competition in the third round.

Statistics

Players statistics

References 

Real Zaragoza seasons
Zaragoza